The Unsuspecting Angel (German: Der ahnungslose Engel) is a 1936 German comedy crime film directed by Franz Seitz and starring Joe Stöckel, Lucie Englisch and Franz Nicklisch. It was shot at the Munich Studios of Bavaria Film and on location in the city. The film's sets were designed by the art director Max Seefelder.

Cast
 Joe Stöckel as Hörl, Grenzoberaufseher  
 Lucie Englisch as Jozi  
 Franz Nicklisch as Hans Markwart, Grenzaufseher  
 Erika Glässner as Frau Bergmann, Wirtin vom Hirschenstand  
 Otto Fassler as Stefan Meser 
 Josef Eichheim as Onkelchen  
 Erna Fentsch as Manja  
 Jola Jobst as Steffi 
 O. E. Hasse as Kornitzki  
 Arnulf Schröder as Babitz  
 Elisabeth Flickenschildt as Lotte Grün  
 Richard Häussler
 Ludwig Schmitz 
 Justus Paris as Heuer  
 Herta Schwarz as Paula  
 Liane Kopf as Frau Guggemoos  
 Michl Lang as Loidl  
 Ludwig Ten Cloot
 Thea Aichbichler 
 Franz Kronach 
 Erika Stauffenberg 
 Lydia Schulenburg

References

Bibliography 
 Bock, Hans-Michael & Bergfelder, Tim. The Concise CineGraph. Encyclopedia of German Cinema. Berghahn Books, 2009.

External links 
 

1936 films
Films of Nazi Germany
German crime comedy films
1930s crime comedy films
1930s German-language films
Films directed by Franz Seitz
Bavaria Film films
Films shot at Bavaria Studios
German black-and-white films
1936 comedy films
1930s German films